Coleophora lineapulvella is a moth of the family Coleophoridae. It is found in the United States, including Oklahoma, Ohio and Kentucky.

The larvae feed on the seeds of Amaranthus hybridus, Amaranthus retroflexus and possibly Prunus and Persica species. They create a trivalved, tubular silken case.

References

lineapulvella
Moths described in 1874
Moths of North America